Wendy Simms is a fictional character from the CBS crime drama CSI: Crime Scene Investigation, portrayed by Liz Vassey. She first appeared in the sixth season episode "Secrets and Flies", broadcast on November 3, 2005.

Casting
After making her debut during the sixth season in 2005, Vassey returned to the series the following year on a recurring basis. During the tenth season, Vassey was promoted to series regular. She was also added to the opening credits. On June 1, 2010, Michael Ausiello from Entertainment Weekly reported that Vassey's contract option had not been picked up and she would be leaving CSI: Crime Scene Investigation. Vassey's departure came at a time when several of the show's actors negotiated their own contracts and Ausiello thought this might be a sign of a big cast shake-up.

Development
In 2009, Vassey expressed her interest in having her character go out into the field, after Wendy accompanied Raymond Langston (Laurence Fishburne) to a crime scene in the episode "Kill Me If You Can". Vassey enjoyed shooting outside in the sun instead of in the lab. She also enjoyed working with John Schneider who appeared in the episode. Vassey thought things were moving in the direction of Wendy being in the field more when she was sent to Las Vegas to do a ride-along and watch an autopsy.

Wendy developed feelings for David Hodges (Wallace Langham), who worked in the lab with her. Vassey said Wendy liked Hodges because she could see something else in him, rather than the "suck-up" everyone else saw. She commented "I think these two characters work well together because it doesn't quite make sense, but it doesn't make sense in all the right ways. It makes me root for them." Langham believed that Wendy's feelings were reciprocated by Hodges and that she was just waiting for him to realize and "take some action." Langham told TV Guides Tim Molloy that his character was also going wrong when it came to making a move on Wendy, as he was not sure of the right thing to say to her. In "A Space Oddity" (2009), Wendy and Hodges become closer and Langham stated that it would be the closest they get for a while without anything happening.

Storylines
Wendy is a DNA Technician and worked in San Francisco, California for a time before moving to Las Vegas to take the DNA tech position ("Secrets and Flies"). In the seventh season episode "Lab Rats" she helps David Hodges investigate the case of The Miniature Killer. The two characters have an ongoing rivalry. Hodges complains that Wendy tries to take over everything and thinks she's "too cool" for the lab. Simms insults Hodges by calling him "freakboy" and "loser" but praises his investigation methods.  Wendy is apparently something of a klutz and has a reputation for being clumsy around work. In the episode "The Theory of Everything" it's revealed that she is a huge Star Trek fan.

Later, she is disappointed when she learns Hodges lied to her about Grissom asking the lab techs to investigate the Miniature Killer.  In an interview with TV Guide, Vassey comments that her character must have been a nerd during her high school days. In the episode "Lab Rats" there is an unfinished sentence by Wendy where she says "I can't believe that for half a second I actually thought I might-!" and gets defensive when Hodges asks what she meant. A later episode, "You Kill Me", sees friction created between Hodges and Simms when she discovers that Hodges has been working on a CSI-based board game that included a caricature of Simms as "Mindy Bimms, the clumsy yet buxom DNA Tech". (The "buxom" reference ties into the eighth-season episode "The Chick Chop Flick Shop", in which Wendy reveals that she was once paid $600 for a cameo role in a horror movie after she left college; a later viewing of the film in the episode leads to a discussion about Simms's breast size.)

In "A Space Oddity" reveals that Simms and Hodges share a liking for the 1960s science-fiction TV series Astro Quest, with Wendy attending a fan convention wearing a costume based upon a uniform from the series. This causes Hodges to have various fantasies with them being characters in the show, something that affects his work, which he blames on Wendy. During the subsequent investigation of a murder at the convention, the two appear to make a connection, with Simms at one point inviting Hodges to her house to watch some Astro Quest episodes. Hodges calls a halt to the flirting after Catherine Willows suggests a relationship between the two would result in one having to change shifts. Also, his fantasies affect his work. They argue, with her stating "It's good you're having fantasies, because it means you're not as oblivious as everyone around here seems to think!" This reveals that many other CSIs have noticed the tension (one even advising Hodges to make the first move). The episode ends with Wendy realizing Hodges returns her feelings for him after decoding something that he said to her in one of the fictional languages (Velikan) of "Astro Quest" which reads "We were made for each other." But Hodges will not date her as it would interfere with his work.

In the episode "Field Mice", Henry asks Wendy for a date, and she agrees. Pranks then start following Henry, and he believes Hodges is responsible. It is revealed at the end of the episode that Wendy is responsible for the pranks, because "what she should want in a man isn't what she does want." When confronted by Catherine and Henry, Wendy tries to confess, but Hodge interrupts and takes the blame. Henry asks Wendy for a rain check on their date. She agrees, but after Henry leaves, she tells Hodges that she and Henry will never be a couple. After a meaningful look at Hodges, she exits the room.  Then Wendy turns around, rushes back to Hodges, and kisses him passionately.

In Season 11, Vassey returned as a special guest star in the episode "Pool Shark" before leaving the show. She said goodbye to the team, including Hodges. She visited her sister in Portland and has decided to join a CSI team there and work in the field. She did not tell Hodges until right before she left because she did not want him trying to convince her to stay. She does not want to leave because she wants a relationship with Hodges, but feels she has to leave because the job is such a great opportunity.

Reception
Elizabeth Sanchez from Men's Fitness branded the character "sassy". Louise Schwartzkoff from The Sydney Morning Herald thought there was "half-hearted sexual tension" between Wendy and Hodges and said they used "vomit-worthy double entendres" while skirting around each other.

References

External links

CSI: Crime Scene Investigation characters
Fictional female scientists
Fictional chemists
Fictional police officers
Television characters introduced in 2005